The DAR 21 Vector II is a Bulgarian ultralight aircraft, designed and produced by Aeroplanes DAR, first flying on 1 August 2000.

When it was available the aircraft was supplied as a kit for amateur construction or as a complete ready-to-fly-aircraft.

The aircraft was introduced in 2001 and production apparently ended in 2014, as by that year the aircraft was no longer advertised for sale by the company.

Design and development
The aircraft was designed to comply with the Fédération Aéronautique Internationale microlight rules. It features a strut-braced high wing, a two-seats-in-tandem enclosed cockpit, conventional landing gear and a single engine in tractor configuration.

The Vector II has riveted stressed skin made with 1050 and 3105 aluminum sheet for corrosion resistance. The fuselage has a square cross-section. Its  span wing employs flaps that can be set to 15° for takeoff and 30° for landing. The standard engine available is the  Rotax 582 twin-cylinder, liquid-cooled, two-stroke powerplant, with the four-stroke  Rotax 912 optional. Solo flight is accomplished from the front seat.

Variants
DAR 21
Standard version with bungee main landing gear suspension.
DAR 21S
Upgraded version with aluminum sprung main landing gear suspension for increased ground clearance.

Specifications (DAR 21)

References

External links

DAR 21 aircraft web page archives on Archive.org
Official video

Homebuilt aircraft
Single-engined tractor aircraft
2000s Bulgarian ultralight aircraft
High-wing aircraft
Vector II